CI Entertainment is a South Korean record label created by Lee Jae-young in 2014. In March 2015, CI merged with actress management company "Secret society entertainment" which was managing actress Jeon So-min at the time. In June 2015, the company hosted an audition to recruit new talents. In 2018, it was announced that the company acquired 100% of the stakes of C9 Entertainment.
The agency currently manages K-Pop artists such as Double S 301, Kim Dong-wan and Jun Jin.

Artists

Groups
Take
SS501 (Inactive)

Sub-units
Double S 301

Soloists
Lee Young-hyun
Kyujong (SS501)
Hyungjun (SS501)
To-day(오늘)
Jun Jin (co-managed by shinhwa company)

Musical actors
 Jang Eun A
 Choi Woori https://ko.m.wikipedia.org/wiki/최우리

Former artists
Kim Dong-wan (2014-2018) (co-managed by Shinhwa Company)
Youngsaeng (SS501) (2015-2017)

References

South Korean record labels
Record labels established in 2014
2014 establishments in South Korea
Entertainment companies established in 2014
Talent agencies of South Korea
Companies based in Seoul